Kings Bridge Halt was part of the Belfast and County Down Railway system.  King's Bridge Halt opened on 1 November 1929 and closed January 1942 during the Second World War.

References

Disused railway stations in County Down
Railway stations opened in 1929
Railway stations closed in 1942
1929 establishments in Northern Ireland
1942 disestablishments in Northern Ireland
Railway stations in Northern Ireland opened in the 20th century